Wilbur D'Alene (25 October 1884 Center Township, Indiana – 2 December 1966 Fort Myers, Florida) was an American racecar driver. His real name may have been Edwin Wilbur Aleon.

Indianapolis 500 results

References

1884 births
1966 deaths
Indianapolis 500 drivers
Racing drivers from Indiana
Racing drivers from Indianapolis
People from Indiana